Edigna (–1109) is a venerated figure in Puch, and is beatified in the Catholic Church. Her historical existence is debated.

Legend 
According to legend, Edigna was a daughter of Henry I of France and Anne of Kiev, and was born . In 1074, at the age of 19, she fled to Bavaria on a farmer's bullock cart to escape an arranged marriage. The farmer stopped in Puch, Fürstenfeldbruck, where a rooster in the cart crowed and a bell rang. Edigna took this as a sign that she should leave the cart. She remained in Puch until her death on 26 February, 1109, living as a hermit in a hollowed-out linden tree and revered by the people as a miracle worker. She did not reveal her royal background, but it was discovered after her death. When she died, holy oil flowed from the tree, but it dried up when attempts were made to sell it.

Edigna has been venerated since her death, and regarded as the patroness saint of Puch.

Historical evidence

In support 
In 1347, a document related to the death of Louis IV near Puch contained the first known written mention of Edigna. In 1624, Matthäus Rader examined her corpse and subsequently wrote a biography of her. Edigna was beatified in the Catholic Church in 1600. In 1976, a grave in the church was discovered, which could have been the burial site of Edigna.

A 1639 votive tablet describes a child from Mammendorf who recovered from an illness immediately after completing a pilgrimage to the site.

Against 
Henry I of France and Anne of Kiev are known to have had four children, named Phillip, Robert, Hugo, and Emma. However, Emma and Edigna may be the same person, because few details about Emma are known.

In the modern day 

A street in Puch called the  leads past the local Church of St. Sebastian, in which an altar is dedicated to Edigna, and past a linden tree.

Ukrainians often make pilgrimages to Puch because Edigna's mother, Anne of Kiev, was from Ukraine. In 2007, Viktor Yushchenko made such a visit while President of Ukraine. An Edigna Association and decennial Edigna Games exist in Puch. , three women in Puch were named Edigna, while eight others had it as their middle name. In Wörth an der Donau, Edigna is venerated by a church called the Church of St. Edigna.

Edigna is considered to be the patroness saint of Puch and a patroness against cattle diseases and theft.

The Edignalinde 
Julius Langbehn, a German nationalist and antisemite who admired Edigna, was buried near the tree in 1907 at his own request; a nearby street is also named after him.

References

External links 

 Website of the Edigna Association in Puch
 
 

Beatified people
1109 deaths
1050 births
Patron saints
Hermits
Daughters of kings